Frederic C. "Buck" Dumaine Jr. (1902 – March 13, 1997, in Weston, Massachusetts) was an American business executive who served as the president of the New York, New Haven and Hartford Railroad from 1951–1954, Avis Rent a Car System from 1957–1962, and the Delaware and Hudson Railroad from 1967–1968. He also served as an executive with the American Woolen Company, Lehigh Coal and Navigation Company, Waltham Watch Company, Fanny Farmer, Boston Edison Company, Bangor and Aroostook Railroad, Pittsburg and Shawmut Railroad, Boston and Maine Railroad, Boston Garden-Arena Corporation, and Springfield and Eastern Street Railway.
From 1963 to 1965 he was the Chairman of the Massachusetts Republican Party.

He donated the land for the original Our Lady of Good Voyage Chapel in Boston.

See also 
List of railroad executives

References 

1902 births
1997 deaths
20th-century American railroad executives
American transportation businesspeople
People from Weston, Massachusetts
Massachusetts Republican Party chairs
Delaware and Hudson Railway
New York, New Haven and Hartford Railroad